François Claude comte du Barail (25 May 1820, in Versailles – 30 January 1902) was a major general, and French Minister of War under the presidency of Marshal MacMahon.

At nineteen, he enlisted in the Oran lancers, and distinguished himself by his bravery at Mostaganem in February 1840, was mentioned in dispatches from the army in 1842, and appointed the same year, Lieutenant.  Decorated for his conduct in making the tribe of Abd al-Qadir, he obtained the rank of Lieutenant after the battle of Isly, where he was wounded, and, after fighting at Laghouat, he was promoted squadron leader in the 5th regiment of hussars.

The following year, he was promoted lieutenant colonel, and given command of the upper circle of Laghouat, he left for chasseurs to pass the guard.  Appointed Colonel of the 1st Regiment Cuirassiers on 30 December 1857, he returned to Africa in 1860, as head of the 3rd Chasseurs and took part, with two squadrons of the regiment in the Mexican War in 1862.

During the Franco-Prussian War of 1870–1871, Barail was given command of a cavalry division comprising four regiments of Chasseurs d'Afrique. His conduct earned him the rank of brigadier general on 23 March 1871.

From May 1873 to May 1874 he was War Minister in the government of Albert de Broglie. He is notably the authority on the general organization of the army. Here ends his career. At the time of the fall of MacMahon (1879), friends of Gambetta, and during his retirement he devoted himself to writing his memoirs.

Works
 "Mes Souvenirs: La Succession de Fleury", La Revue hebdomadaire. N°82. (T.XIX, 3ème livraison). Paris, Plon-Nourit, 16 décembre 1893
 Mes souvenirs, Plon, 1897-1898

External links
 

1820 births
1902 deaths
People from Versailles
French generals
French Ministers of War
Politicians of the French Third Republic
French military personnel of the Franco-Prussian War